is a former Japanese football player.

Club statistics

References

External links

j-league

1987 births
Living people
Ritsumeikan University alumni
Association football people from Okayama Prefecture
Japanese footballers
J2 League players
Fagiano Okayama players
Association football midfielders